Andrew Jonathan Todd (born 22 February 1979) is an English footballer who last played as a midfielder for Matlock Town.

Playing career

Burton Albion
He was part of the Burton Albion side under Nigel Clough that drew 0–0 against Manchester United in the F.A cup.

Accrington Stanley
He was signed by Accrington Stanley from Conference side Burton Albion in the summer of 2006 after impressing during a loan spell at the end of the 2005–06 season.

Rotherham United
Todd was signed by Rotherham United on a two-year deal on 17 May 2007, after turning down a new deal from Accrington. He rejoined Accrington on a month's loan in January 2008.

On 2 October 2008, he signed a three-month loan deal with one of his former clubs, Eastwood Town and made a great start scoring one and assisting in another goal in a 3–1 win over Nantwich Town.

Mansfield Town
On 28 June 2011, Todd returned to football, signing as a player-coach at Mansfield Town He made his debut on 13 August against Bath City. On 22 October he scored his first league goal and winner against local rivals Alfreton Town. In the 2012–13 season Todd was a member of Mansfield's Conference National title winning squad.

Tamworth
Todd left The Stags in July 2013 after he was offered a coaching role at the club, but he was looking to extend his playing career. A month later he joined Conference Premier side Tamworth following a successful trial.

AFC Telford United
It was announced on 4 July 2014 Todd would join Telford as player/coach for the upcoming season.

Hednesford Town
Todd signed for Hednesford Town on 13 February 2015. He fractured his radius and dislocated his ulna in his arm on 7 January 2016, and did not feature anymore for Hednesford Town.

Matlock Town
He joined Matlock Town for the 2016–17 season, and in September 2016 he moved on to Long Eaton United on loan for a month.

Honours
FA Trophy runner-up: 2004–05
Conference National winner: 2005–06 2012–13

Notes

External links

1979 births
Living people
Footballers from Nottingham
English footballers
Association football forwards
Nottingham Forest F.C. players
Scarborough F.C. players
Eastwood Town F.C. players
Worksop Town F.C. players
Hucknall Town F.C. players
Burton Albion F.C. players
Accrington Stanley F.C. players
Rotherham United F.C. players
Mansfield Town F.C. players
Tamworth F.C. players
AFC Telford United players
Hednesford Town F.C. players
Matlock Town F.C. players
Long Eaton United F.C. players
English Football League players
National League (English football) players